Thunder in the City is a 1937 British drama film directed by Marion Gering and starring Edward G. Robinson, Luli Deste, Nigel Bruce and Ralph Richardson.

Plot

An American salesman with radically successful methods visits England ostensibly to learn a more dignified manner of salesmanship. He is mistaken for a millionaire by a cash-poor family of noble ancestry with a stately home to sell which he can't afford to buy. But by working with them instead he finds romance and equal success in business with his old marketing techniques.

Cast 
Edward G. Robinson as Daniel "Dan" Armstrong
Luli Deste as Lady Patricia "Pat" Graham
Nigel Bruce as Duke of Glenavon
Constance Collier as Duchess of Glenavon
Ralph Richardson as Henry V. Manningdale
Arthur Wontner as Sir Peter "Pete" Challoner
Nancy Burne as Edna, the Singer
Annie Esmond as Lady Challoner
Cyril Raymond as James
Elizabeth Inglis as Dolly
James Carew as Mr. Snyderling
Everley Gregg as Millie, Dan's Secretary in New York
Donald Calthrop as Dr. Plumet, the Chemist
Billy Bray as Bill, the Pianist

Soundtrack 
Main dramatic Score by Miklos Rozsa.
 "Pomp and Circumstance March No.1 in D" (Music by Edward Elgar, words ("Land of Hope and Glory") by Arthur C. Benson)
 Billy Bray and Nancy Burne - "She Was Poor But She Was Honest"
 "For He's a Jolly Good Fellow" (Traditional)
 Billy Bray and Nancy Burne - "Magnelite"
 Stockholders - "Magnelite"
 Stockholders - "Auld Lang Syne" (Scottish traditional music, lyrics by Robert Burns)

Reception
Writing for The Spectator in 1937, Graham Greene gave the film a poor review, labeling it "worst English film of the quarter". Greene criticized the special effects and its "complete ignorance - in spite of its national studio - of English life and behaviour". Conceding that the film is, after all, a fantasy, Greene nonetheless complains that "even a fantasy needs some relation to life".

References

External links 

1937 films
1937 romantic drama films
British black-and-white films
Films set in London
Films directed by Marion Gering
Films scored by Miklós Rózsa
British romantic drama films
Films about businesspeople
Films about advertising
United Artists films
Columbia Pictures films
1930s English-language films
1930s British films